Street Survivors: The True Story of the Lynyrd Skynyrd Plane Crash is a 2020 American musical survival drama film directed by Jared Cohn and written by Cohn and Brian Perera. The film stars Ian Shultis, Taylor Clift, Samuel Kay Forrest, Rich Dally III, Neill Byrnes, Anthony Rocco Bovo and Mark Dippolito.

The film premiered at the 2020 Hollywood Reel Independent Film Festival, and released on DVD, Blu-Ray, and video on demand on June 30, 2020.

Cast 
 Ian Shultis as Artimus Pyle
 Taylor Clift as Ronnie Van Zant
 Samuel Kay Forrest as Steve Gaines
 Rich Dally III as Allen Collins
 Sierra Intoccio as Leslie Hawkins
 Lelia Symington as Cassie Gaines
 Chris Peritore as Ed King
 Neill Byrnes as Steven Tyler
 Kelly Lynn Reiter as Margie
 Anthony Rocco Bovo as Joe Perry
 Keith Sutliff as Everett Farley
 Hudson Long as Billy Powell
 Nick Cairo as Leon Wilkeson
 David Roy Banks
 Sean McNabb
 Collin Lee Ellis as Kevin Elson
 Mark Dippolito as Ron Eckerman
 Anthony Jensen as Agent Wallace
 Alyssa Talbot as Nurse
 Marley Uribe as Emma the groupie
 Bill Devlin as Hotel Manager
Julie Zimmer as JoJo Billingsley
 Jor-el Vaasborg as Hospital Worker

SPFX Kevin Watson 
SPFX Nick Plantico

Production 
On June 23, 2016, it was reported that Cleopatra Entertainment was producing a biopic about the rock band, Lynyrd Skynyrd, whose plane crashed on October 20, 1977, killing three band members Ronnie Van Zant (Lead Vocals), Steve Gaines (Guitar), and Cassie Gaines (Backup Vocals), Dean Kilpatrick (assistant road manager) and the two pilots, when the tour plane ran out of fuel over Mississippi. Jared Cohn was to direct the film from his own and Brian Perera's script, based on the original story about the plane crash written by one of the band members, Artimus Pyle. On April 4, 2017, lead cast was announced, including Ian Shultis as Pyle, Taylor Clift as Ronnie Van Zant, Samuel Kay Forrest as Steve Gaines, Rich Dally III as Allen Collins, and Sean McNabb. On April 23, Neill Byrnes and Anthony Rocco Bovo were cast in the film to play Steven Tyler, and Joe Perry, respectively, while the other cast included Keith Sutliff, Hudson Long as Billy Powell, and Nick Cairo as Leon Wilkeson.

Principal photography on the film began on April 24, 2017 in Los Angeles.

On August 28, 2017, a United States District Court judge issued a court injunction, blocking production of the film. On October 10, 2018, a three-judge panel of the United States Circuit Court of Appeals for the Second Circuit in Manhattan overturned the previous injunction against Street Survivors.

References

External links 
 

2020 films
2020 biographical drama films
2020s disaster films
2020s musical drama films
American aviation films
American biographical drama films
American disaster films
American musical drama films
American survival films
Biographical films about musicians
Disaster films based on actual events
Drama films based on actual events
Films about aviation accidents or incidents
Cultural depictions of rock musicians
Cultural depictions of American men
2020s English-language films
Films directed by Jared Cohn
2020s American films